"Samantha" is an electropop song performed by Norwegian singer Margaret Berger. The song was written by Jukka Immonen, Berger and Patric Sarin for her second album Pretty Scary Silver Fairy (2006). It was released as the album's lead single on 19 June 2006.

Formats and track listings
These are the formats and track listings of major single releases of "Samantha". 

CD single
(82876-85605-2; Released 19 June 2006)
 "Samantha" – 3:29

Digital download
(Released 19 June 2006)
 "Samantha" – 3:29

Personnel
The following people contributed to "Samantha":

Margaret Berger – lead vocals, backing vocals
Jukka Immonen – production, mixing
Thomas Eberger – mastering 
Pål Laukli – photography

Chart performance

Release history

References

External links
Official MySpace
Lyrics of this song – Samantha

2006 debut singles
Margaret Berger songs
Songs written by Jukka Immonen
Songs written by Patric Sarin
Sony BMG singles
2006 songs